Umlekan is a rural locality (a selo) and the administrative center of Umlekansky Selsoviet of Zeysky District, Amur Oblast, Russia. The population was 256 as of 2018. There are 8 streets.

Geography 
Umlekan is located 76 km south of Zeya (the district's administrative centre) by road. Rublevka is the nearest rural locality.

References 

Rural localities in Zeysky District